How Soon Is Now? is a 2007 Swedish drama television serial directed by Mikael Marcimain. The narrative portrays four people who grow up in Gothenburg between 1966 and 1976. The serial was produced for Sveriges Television, from a screenplay by Peter Birro.

Cast
 Sverrir Gudnason as Tommy Berglund
 Fanny Risberg as Lena Lindblom
 Simon J. Berger as Erik Westfeldt
 Ruth Vega Fernandez as Rebecka Söderström
 Johan Kylén as Ingvar Berglund
 Anna Bjelkerud as Karin Berglund
 Mikaela Knapp as Anna Berglund
 Ida Redig as Annica

References

External links

2007 Swedish television series debuts
2007 Swedish television series endings
2000s Swedish television series
Swedish drama television series
Swedish television miniseries